Matt Moore may refer to:
 Matt Moore (actor) (1888–1960), Irish-born American film actor
 Matt Moore (American football) (born 1984), American football quarterback
 Matt Moore (basketball), National Basketball League player
 Matt Moore (musician), guitarist, vocalist, and video director from Southern Missouri
 Matt Moore (baseball) (born 1989), Major League Baseball player
 Matt Moore (politician) (born 1982), American politician

See also
 Matthew Moore, American songwriter who collaborated with Joe Cocker and Leon Russell